The Spike Drivers was a band from Detroit, Michigan and played from 1965 to 1967.

The Spike Drivers began by working in various coffeehouses and clubs in the Detroit, Michigan folk rock music scene. Their music was rooted in folk, blues, and classical music. The band name was suggested by its vocalist Marycarol Brown, originating from a song about John Henry by Mississippi John Hurt called "Spike Driver Blues". The band shared the stage with performers such as Joni Mitchell and Del Shannon. 

The band traveled to New York City and landed a recording contract with Warner Brothers Reprise Records where they put out two 45's featuring "Strange Mysterious Sounds" with "Break Out The Wine" and "Often I Wonder" with "High Time." The band was showcased at many clubs in the New York area with the high point occurring when they opened for Eric Burdon and the Animals at the Rheingold Central Park Music Festival in 1966.

Ted Lucas and Richard Keelan left the band in 1967 to record as the Misty Wizards. They were replaced in the Spike Drivers by Marshall Rubinoff and Ron Cobb. After both groups dissolved, Lucas released a self-titled solo album, Keelan relocated to Canada and performed in the Perth County Conspiracy, and Sid Brown released albums as part of the music collective, Peace, Bread & Land Band, who had four LPs between 1969 and 1978. Former member Steve Booker came to be known as Muruga Booker and still records and performs today. Rubinoff, who was married to actress Lin Shaye, relocated from Detroit to San Francisco after his attempts to form another band following the dissolution of the Spike Drivers failed; he died there in a motorcycle accident on July 7, 1968, a few days past his 24th birthday.

Founding Members 
Marycarol Brown - vocals
Sid Brown - guitar
Ted Lucas - guitar, vocals
Richard Keelan - bass, vocals
Steve Booker - drums
Larry Cruse - drums (replaced Steve Booker in late 1965)

References

External links
 

American folk rock groups